Mount McKenzie, Mount MacKenzie or Mount Mackenzie may refer to:
 Mount McKenzie (Antarctica), a peak in the Amery Peaks in Mac. Robertson Land, Antarctica
 Mount McKenzie, South Australia, a locality in the Barossa Valley
 Mount MacKenzie, a volcanic peak northeast of Hagensborg, British Columbia, Canada
 Mount Mackenzie, a mountain southeast of Revelstoke, British Columbia, Canada
 Mount Mackenzie King, a peak in the Premier Range of the Cariboo Mountains in east-central British Columbia, Canada
 Mount MacKenzie / Pakihiwitahi, a hill in Otago, New Zealand
 McKenzie Nunatak in Victoria land, Antarctica
 McKenzie Peak, Mac. Robertson Land, Antarctica